Plesiocochylis is a genus of moths in the  family Tortricidae. It consists of only one species, Plesiocochylis gnathosia, which is found in Ecuador (Pichincha Province).

The wingspan is about 16 mm. The ground colour of the forewings is cream with weak ferruginous suffusions and diffuse spots. The hindwings are cream, in the apical area tinged with pale ochreous.

Etymology
The generic name refers to plesiomorphic genital characters of the genus. The species name refers to the presence of a large gnathos.

References

Cochylini